Batugade is a suco (village) located in Balibó Subdistrict, Bobonaro Municipality of East Timor. The administrative seat of the suco is the village of Batugade.

Batugade is located on the main road between Dili and Kupang, the capital of Nusa Tenggara Timur Province of Indonesia in the western part of Timor island. A major immigration post for the border crossing into Indonesia, called the Batugade Integrated Border Post, is located in the suco about 3km from the village of Batugade.

Border Crossing
The Batugade Integrated Border Post is located near the East Timor-Indonesia border, about 3km from the village of Batugade. This is the main border crossing into Indonesia with complete customs, immigration and quarantine facilities. The border crossing checkpoint on the Indonesian side is called Mota'ain. 

The new CIQ complex was opened on 4 February 2012 by then East Timor Prime Minister Xanana Gusmão. The border crossing facilities includes a dock for boats to ensure maritime control and curb illegal trade between Indonesia and East Timor. The complex replaced the old checkpoint which consisted of several small buildings which were set up to handle border crossing procedures when East Timor separated from Indonesia. The Batugade Customs at this checkpoint collects the second highest amount of revenue after Customs at Dili Port.

Shooting Incident of 1999
On 10 October 1999, International Force East Timor (INTERFET) troops - a platoon from 2 RAR - patrolling along the main road between Batugade and Mota'ain were shot at as they were approaching the border bridge at Mota'ain while still within East Timor territory. Reports stated that the shots were fired by either pro-Indonesian militia or the Indonesian police. The INTERFET troops returned fire and in the ensuing clash, one Indonesian was killed. Reports stated that in a meeting between the Indonesian army and INTERFET following the incident established that the INTERFET troops were still about 100 metres inside East Timor territory when they were fired upon.

Gallery

External links
 Timor-Leste Immigration Department 
Video clip on YouTube of the Mota'ain Shooting Incident on 10 October 1999

References

Populated places in East Timor
Bobonaro Municipality
East Timor–Indonesia border crossings